This is a list of notable people from Trenčín. 

Gábor Baross, statesman
Milan Bartovič, ice hockey player (HC Slovan Bratislava)
Tomáš Belic, footballer
Mário Bližňák, ice hockey player
Zdeno Chára, ice hockey player (Boston Bruins)
Matthew Csák (disambiguation), multiple people
Jakab Cseszneky, medieval magnate
Oliver von Dohnányi, conductor
Martin Fabuš, footballer
Marián Gáborík, ice hockey player (Ottawa Senators)
Pavol Hamžík, former Foreign Minister of Slovakia
Marcel Hossa, ice hockey player (HK Dukla Trenčín)
Marián Hossa, retired ice hockey player
Elisabeth Klein, pianist
Joseph Zack Kornfeder, communist
Matej Krajčík, footballer
Ľuboš Križko, Olympic swimmer
Ján Kubica, sprint canoeist
Radoslav Kunzo, footballer
Richard Lintner, ice hockey player
Andrej Meszároš, ice hockey player (HC Slovan Bratislava)
Juraj Mikúš, ice hockey player
Andrej Nedorost, ice hockey player
Peter Ölvecký, ice hockey player
Anna Pichrtová, mountain runner
Branko Radivojevič, ice hockey player (HK Dukla Trenčín)
Ľubomír Sekeráš, ice hockey player
Kamil Susko, footballer
Róbert Švehla, ice hockey player
Ján Svorada, racing cyclist
Roman Tvrdoň, ice hockey player
Jaroslav Volek, musicologist and semiotician
Tomáš Záborský, ice hockey player
Vojtech Zamarovský, writer

 
Trencin